The Oceania Cross Country Championships are a biennial Cross country running competition organized by the Oceania Athletics Association (OAA) for athletes representing the countries of its member associations. They were established in 2009, and were held together with either the Australian or New Zealand national championships.  Races are featured for senior and U20 and U18 athletes.

Editions

Results 
Complete results can be found on the OAA, on the Athletics New Zealand, and the Athletics Australia webpages.  Results for the juniors can be found on the World Junior Athletics History site.

Men's results

†: Edwin Kaitany from  running as guest was 1st in 38:54.

Women's results

Junior Boys' Results

Junior Girls' Results

References 

Continental athletics championships
Cross country running competitions
Recurring sporting events established in 2009
Cross country
Athletics team events
Oceanian championships
Biennial athletics competitions